The 8th constituency of Essonne is a French legislative constituency in the Essonne department. Its member of the National Assembly has been Nicolas Dupont-Aignan since 1997.

Description

The 8th constituency of Essonne is in the north east of the department and consists of the Parisian suburbs around Yerres and Vigneux-sur-Seine. The seat was created in 1986 as the number of seats in Essonne grew from four to ten reflecting the rapidly increasing population and urbanisation of the department.

Against the national trend the seat was won by Gaullist Nicolas Dupont-Aignan in 1997. Dupont-Aignan went on to break away from the mainstream Union for a Popular Movement with his own Debout La France party. The party campaigns on a more traditional Gaullist platform but has met with little electoral success outside its leaders home seat.

Historic Representation

Election results

2022

2017

2012

Sources

Official results of French elections from 2002: "Résultats électoraux officiels en France" (in French).

8